The Liberal Revolution of 1820 was a Portuguese political revolution that erupted in 1820. It began with a military insurrection in the city of Porto, in northern Portugal, that quickly and peacefully spread to the rest of the country. The Revolution resulted in the return in 1821 of the Portuguese Court to Portugal from Brazil, where it had fled during the Peninsular War, and initiated a constitutional period in which the 1822 Constitution was ratified and implemented. The movement's liberal ideas had an important influence on Portuguese society and political organization in the nineteenth century.

Historical background 
From 1807 to 1811 Napoleonic French forces invaded Portugal three times. As a result, the Portuguese royal family was transferred to the Portuguese colony of Brazil, where it remained until 1821. From Brazil, the Portuguese king João VI ruled his transcontinental empire for thirteen years.

Following the defeat of the French forces in 1814, Portugal experienced a prolonged period of political turmoil, in which many sought greater self-rule for the Portuguese people. Eventually this unrest put an end to the King's long stay in Brazil, when his return to Portugal was demanded by the revolutionaries.

Even though the Portuguese had participated in the defeat of the French, the country found itself virtually a colony of Brazil or British protectorate. The officers of the Portuguese Army resented British control of the Portuguese armed forces. The city of Porto, with a strong, dynamic bourgeoisie and with liberal tradition, was the place where the Liberal Revolution began.

After Napoleon's definite defeat in 1815, a clandestine Supreme Regenerative Council of Portugal and the Algarve was formed in Lisbon by army officers and freemasons, headed by General Gomes Freire de Andrade—Grand Master of the Grande Oriente Lusitano and former general under Napoleon until his defeat in 1814—with the objective to end British control of the country and to promote "the salvation and independence" of the pátria. In its brief existence the movement attempted to introduce liberalism in Portugal, although it ultimately failed to do so. In 1817 three masons, João de Sá Pereira Soares, Morais Sarmento and José Andrade Corvo, denounced the movement to the authorities, who arrested many suspects, including Freire de Andrade, who was charged with conspiracy against John VI, represented in continental Portugal by a regency, then overseen by the British military authority headed by William Carr Beresford.

In October 1817, the Regency found the twelve of the accused guilty of treason against the nation and sentenced them to death by hanging. Beresford intended to suspend the sentence until it was confirmed by John VI, but the Regency, judging that such a move was a slight to its authority, ordered their immediate execution, which took place on 18 October at Campo do Santana (today, "Field of the Martyrs of the Fatherland"). Freire de Andrade was executed on the same day at the São Julião da Barra Fort. The executions sparked protests against Beresford and the Regency and intensified anti-British feeling in the country.

A couple of years after the executions, Beresford left for Brazil to ask the King for more resources and powers to suppress the lingering presence of what he called "Jacobinism," which were granted to him. In his absence, the Revolution of Porto broke out in 1820, and upon his arrival from Brazil, he was forbidden to disembark in Lisbon.

Revolution

Influenced by the concurrent Trienio Liberal Revolution in Spain of 1 January 1820, a liberal revolution started in Porto, quickly spreading without resistance to several other Portuguese cities and towns, culminating with the revolt of Lisbon. The revolutionaries demanded the immediate return of the royal court to continental Portugal in order to "restore the metropolitan dignity." In fact, the liberal revolution of 1820 not only forced the return of the King but also demanded a constitutional monarchy to be set up in Portugal. The revolutionaries also sought to restore Portuguese exclusivity in the trade with Brazil, reverting Brazil to the status of a colony, officially to be reduced to a "Principality of Brazil," instead of the Kingdom of Brazil, which it had been for the past five years. The Brazilian kingdom had legally been an equal, constituent part of the United Kingdom of Portugal, Brazil and the Algarves. The revolutionaries organized the election of a constitutional assembly which debated the nature of the future government. The elections resulted in deputies who were primarily from the professions (lawyers, professors) and not from the merchants who had spearheaded the revolution. Professionals now took the lead in the revolution. The constitution that was approved in 1822 was closely modeled on the Spanish Constitution of 1812.

Aftermath
After John VI returned to Portugal in 1821, his heir-apparent, Pedro, became regent of the Kingdom of Brazil. Following a series of political events and disputes, Brazil declared its independence from Portugal on 7 September 1822. On 12 October 1822, Pedro was acclaimed as the first Emperor of Brazil. He was crowned on 1 December 1822. Portugal recognized Brazil's sovereignty in 1825.

In 1823, the first revolt against the constitutional order was organized by Prince Miguel and Brigadier João Carlos Saldanha, which managed to close the parliament and to convince King João VI to recall Beresford as an advisor. In 1826 João VI died with no clear heir, further destabilizing the nation. Upon seizing the throne, Miguel led another revolt against the constitutional government, triggering six years of civil wars, which pitted him against his brother, now Pedro IV of Portugal, who headed the liberal faction.

See also 
History of Portugal (1777–1834)
Liberalism in Portugal
Remexido

References

Bibliography 

Liberalism in Portugal
19th-century revolutions
1820 in Portugal
Revolutions in Portugal
1822 in Portugal
History of Porto
Aftermath of the Napoleonic Wars
Revolutions during the 1820s